Following are the results of the 2010 Open GDF Suez doubles.  The 2010 Open GDF Suez was a women's professional tennis tournament played on indoor hard courts. It was the 18th edition of the Open GDF Suez (formerly known as the Open Gaz de France) and was a Premier tournament on the 2010 WTA Tour. It took place at Stade Pierre de Coubertin in Paris, France from February 8 through February 14, 2010.

Cara Black and Liezel Huber were the defending champions. However, they withdrew before their match against Iveta Benešová and Barbora Záhlavová-Strýcová in the final due to health reasons of Black.

Seeds

Draw

Draw

External links
 Main Draw

Doubles 2010
Open GDF Suez - Doubles